The Girl from the Rhine is a 1922 German silent romance film directed by Hans Felsing and starring Ellen Plessow.

Cast
In alphabetical order
Paul Conradi as Winegrower Anton Langbein
Vera Conti as recruiter
Carl Geppert
Melitta Klefer as Christl Pröppke, daughter
Manfred Koempel-Pilot as Lotse Jörg
Ellen Plessow as Frau Langbein
Fritz Russ as Pröppke, village schoolmaster
Mizzi Schütz as Anna Pröppke
Emil Stammer as Pensioner Kußlich
Helene Voß as Lene Voß
Gustav Zeitzschel

References

External links

Films of the Weimar Republic
Films directed by Hans Felsing
German silent feature films
German black-and-white films